Combined Command Reconnaissance Activities, Korea (CCRAK) was a United States Air Force special operations unit of the Korean War. It had operational control over the 6167th Air Base Group, B Flight and Special Air Missions detachment aircraft.

Special operations units of the United States Air Force